The Dutch Transport Safety Board (Raad voor de Transportveiligheid, RvTV) was an agency of the government of the Netherlands. Its head office was originally on the fifth floor of the Bruggebouw West in The Hague. It later moved to Anna van Saksenlaan 50.

The agency was established on 1 July 1999. The Netherlands Aviation Safety Board was merged into the RvTV on 1 July 1999.

The agency had four departments: Aviation, Rail, Road Transport, and Shipping.

It was replaced in 2005 by the Dutch Safety Board.

References

External links

 Dutch Transport Safety Board (Archive)
 Dutch Transport Safety Board (Archive) 

Government agencies of the Netherlands
Rail accident investigators
Organizations investigating aviation accidents and incidents
Transport safety organizations
Organisations based in The Hague
1999 establishments in the Netherlands
2005 disestablishments in the Netherlands
Transport organisations based in the Netherlands
Defunct transport organisations based in the Netherlands